
Year 290 (CCXC) was a common year starting on Wednesday (link will display the full calendar) of the Julian calendar. In the Roman Empire, it was known as the Year of the Consulship of Valerius and Valerius (or, less frequently, year 1043 Ab urbe condita). The denomination 290 for this year has been used since the early medieval period, when the Anno Domini calendar era became the prevalent method in Europe for naming years.

Events 
 By place 

 Roman Empire 
 Emperor Diocletian campaigns with success against Arabic enemies.
 Following his victory over Emperor Maximian's fleet, the usurper Carausius invades the European mainland and re-establishes his military and administrative presence in northern Gaul. 

 Asia 
 May 16 – Emperor Wu of Jin, founder of the Western Jin Dynasty, dies after a 25-year reign. He reunifies north and south, but gives away many dukedoms to his kinsmen. Crown Prince Sima Zhong succeeds his father, and has to deal with conflicts among the aristocratic families in China.

Births 
 Abramios the Recluse, Christian hermit and ascetic (d. 360)
 Pappus of Alexandria, Greek mathematician (d. 350)
 Vitus (or Guido), Roman hagiographer and martyr

Deaths 
 May 16 – Wu of Jin, Chinese emperor of the Jin Dynasty (b. 236)
 Tao Huang (or Shiying), Chinese general and politician

References